Christopher Georgesco (born 1950 in Lincoln, Nebraska) is an American sculptor.  He is the son of modernist architect Haralamb H. Georgescu.

He began his career in Venice, California in 1968, where he worked until 1980.  His studio was located on Abbot Kenny, formerly West Washington Blvd.  His first Show was at Newspace Gallery, Los Angeles, where he continues to be represented more than 35 years later.

He now lives on the outskirts of Palm Springs, where he built a Studio Compound.

His first solo show was deemed an overnight success by William Wilson, critic for The Los Angeles Times, and was picked up by L.A.'s top collectors.  Wilson also cited Christopher Georgesco as "pushing the art world's masterpiece button" with his  Totemic Concrete & Steel Columns and Tripods.  His first solo show was followed by an exhibition at the Los Angeles County Museum of Art titled L.A.8.

In an article in Art News, Richard Armstrong, the former curator of the La Jolla Museum of Contemporary Art, CA, cited Christopher Georgesco as being one of the most interesting sculptors in Los Angeles." Armstrong also claims Christopher Georgesco has few peers among L.A. Sculptors in an article in Art in America." Georgesco has continued to work with the same vocabulary of shapes for the last 35 years.  He exhibited in the Netherlands, and The Ludwig Forum Museum in Aachen, Germany.

Public collections 
 American Embassy, Bucharest, Romania
 Metropolitan Museum of Art, New York, NY
 Grand Hyatt Hotel, Tokyo, Japan
 La Jolla Museum of Contemporary Art, California
 Laguna Beach Museum of Contemporary Art, California
 Palm Springs Art Museum, Palm Springs, California
 University of California Los Angeles, California
 University of Santa Barbara, California
 Valley Presbyterian Hospital, Los Angeles, California
 Pasadena Plaza, City of Pasadena, California
 King World Productions, Los Angeles, California
 Princes Cruise Lines, Installation Italy
 Caribbean Cruise Lines, Installation Norway
 Knapp Communications, Los Angeles, California
 McCrory Corporate, New York, NY
 Raychem Corporation, Los Angeles, California
 Sea Horse Corporation, Manzanillo, Mexico
 Pasadena City College, California
 City of Palm Springs, California

Notes

References 
 Jorie Parr, "Revisiting Modernism". Palm Springs Life Magazine. March 2009, p 162-164
 Richard Armstrong, "Christopher Georgesco at Newspace Gallery". Art Forum. v18. no. 3, November 1977, p 75-78
 Melinda Wortz, "Psychological Manipulation". Art News, v 76, May 1977, p 104-106
 La Jolla Museum of Contemporary Art 1977, Catalog "Four Californians".Four Californians : Christopher Georgesco, Patsy Krebs, Andrew Spence, Robert Therrien. - La Jolla : La Jolla Museum of *Contemporary Art, c1977 . - [ 22] c. : Ill. (some color. ) 18x18 cm. - In USA 2 ( F.M. )
 Los Angeles County Museum 1976, Catalog "L.A.8"
 "L.A. Rising: SoCal Artists before 1980". by Lyn Kienholz, California/ International Arts Foundation 2010. Page 196

External links 
 Website
  Christopher Georgesco: Romanian-American Sculptor

1950 births
Living people
20th-century American sculptors
American people of Romanian descent
Artists from Lincoln, Nebraska
People from Venice, Los Angeles
University of Santa Monica alumni
21st-century American sculptors